Reverón is a surname. Notable people with the surname include:

People 
Adriana Reverón (born 1985), Spanish model and beauty pageant titleholder
Armando Reverón (1889–1954), Venezuelan painter and sculptor
Jorge Díaz Reverón, Puerto Rican judge

Films 
Reverón can also refer to the following films:

 Reverón, 1952 documentary film directed by Margot Benacerraf
 Reverón, 2011 film directed by Diego Rísquez